Wayne Lewis (born 17 August 1962) is a Jamaican cricketer. He played in 32 first-class and 14 List A matches for the Jamaican cricket team from 1984 to 1995.

See also
 List of Jamaican representative cricketers

References

External links
 

1962 births
Living people
Jamaican cricketers
Jamaica cricketers
Cricketers from Kingston, Jamaica